Ethnos (from ) may refer to:
Ethnic group
Ethnos (newspaper), Greek weekly
Ethnos, fantasy strategy board game by CMON Limited